Jorge Luís da Silva (born 22 March 1965), commonly known as Jorginho or sometimes Jorginho Cantinflas, is a Brazilian professional football coach and former player who played as a midfielder.

Career
Jorginho played in several clubs, like Portuguesa, Palmeiras, Coritiba, Atlético Mineiro, Santos, Fluminense.
While at Santos he scored their 10,000th goal.

Began his coaching career at Palmeiras when he replace Vanderlei Luxemburgo as a caretaker coach at the 2009 Campeonato Brasileiro Série A.

On 5 September 2013, Nautico coach Jorginho resigned after just five games, all defeats, in charge of the Brazilian club.

Honours

Player 
Paysandu
 Campeonato Paraense: 1992

Atlético Mineiro
 Copa Conmebol: 1997

Santos
 Copa Conmebol: 1998

Manager 
Portuguesa
 Campeonato Brasileiro Série B: 2011

Figueirense
 Copa Santa Catarina: 2021

References

External links
Galo Digital

1965 births
Living people
Footballers from São Paulo
Brazilian footballers
Campeonato Brasileiro Série A players
Brazilian football managers
Campeonato Brasileiro Série A managers
Campeonato Brasileiro Série B managers
Campeonato Brasileiro Série C managers
Associação Portuguesa de Desportos players
Sociedade Esportiva Palmeiras players
Esporte Clube Santo André players
Paysandu Sport Club players
Coritiba Foot Ball Club players
Esporte Clube Juventude players
Paulista Futebol Clube players
Clube Atlético Mineiro players
Santos FC players
Paraná Clube players
Associação Atlética Portuguesa (Santos) players
Fluminense FC players
Rio Branco Esporte Clube players
Avaí FC players
Sociedade Esportiva Palmeiras managers
Goiás Esporte Clube managers
Associação Atlética Ponte Preta managers
Associação Portuguesa de Desportos managers
Club Athletico Paranaense managers
Esporte Clube Bahia managers
Clube Náutico Capibaribe managers
Esporte Clube Vitória managers
Associação Chapecoense de Futebol managers
Atlético Clube Goianiense managers
Esporte Clube Água Santa managers
Figueirense FC managers
Association football midfielders